Lal Parsa  is a village development committee in Parsa District in the Narayani Zone of southern Nepal. At the time of the 2011 Nepal census it had a population of 4,478 people living in 616 individual households. There were 2,324 males and 2,154 females at the time of census.

References

Populated places in Parsa District